Evo is a carsharing service in Greater Vancouver and Victoria, created by the British Columbia Automobile Association. The company offers exclusively Toyota Prius Hybrid vehicles with roof-top bike racks and features one-way point-to-point rentals. Users are charged by the minute, with hourly and daily rates available. Launched in March 2015, it currently serves most of Vancouver, and selected destinations in neighboring cities. In August 2021, the service was brought to Victoria. The company is considering moving into the tri-cities area in the future.

See also 
 Car2Go
 Modo
 Zipcar
GIG Car Share

References

External links 

 

Carsharing
Organizations based in British Columbia
2015 establishments in British Columbia
Canadian companies established in 2015